is a Japanese football player. He plays for Consadole Sapporo.

Playing career
Yuki Uchiyama joined to J2 League club; Consadole Sapporo in 2014. In 2015, he moved to Hougang United. In 2016, he back to Hokkaido Consadole Sapporo.

Club statistics
Updated to 23 February 2018.

References

External links
Profile at Gainare Tottori
Profile at Consadole Sapporo

1995 births
Living people
Association football people from Hokkaido
Japanese footballers
J2 League players
J3 League players
Hokkaido Consadole Sapporo players
Gainare Tottori players
J.League U-22 Selection players
Association football defenders
Sportspeople from Sapporo